The Nigerian Business Coalition Against AIDS (NIBUCAA) is a coalition of Private organizations in Nigeria with the aim to complement government's effort in combating the HIV/AIDS epidemic in Nigeria. It was inaugurated on the 15th of February, 2003 by the former president of Nigeria, Chief Olusegun Obasanjo as part of the Nigerian national response to the HIV epidemic. The purpose of the Coalition is to harness the resources of the private sector to support the government in preventing the spread and mitigating the impact of HIV and AIDS in communities; to ensure that people within the corporate workforce, the most-at-risk population and Nigerians in general have access to HIV Counselling, testing, support and Information.

The Coalition is headquartered in Lagos, Nigeria. It serves as a representative of the private sector on the Global Fund County Coordinating Mechanism. Currently, the Coalition is chaired by Herbert Wigwe, with Aliko Dangote, Mike Sangster, Osagie Okunbor, and Lars Richter as board members and Isaiah Owolabi as chief executive officer. The Coalition stated in February 2022 that about 1.9 millions NIgerians are living with the HIV virus in the country. Only 1.6 million people are receiving treatment of the 1.9 million living with the virus. The Nigerian Business Coalition Against AIDS (NIBUCAA) was able to provide support for about 300 people living with HIV with the help of ACCESS Bank. One of the Coalition main aim is to provide partnership  to thye Federal Government in the fighting of HIV, providing necessary education and community based program  aimed at reducing the spread of the Virus. the Coalition also target the reduction of the HIV Virus through Self testing, capacity building and awareness creation i among the Nigerian Workforce.

Members 

 Access Bank plc
 Aliko Dangote Foundation
 Julius Berger (company)
 TotalEnergies
 Chevron Corporation
 Shell Nigeria
 Yinka Folawiyo Group
 Century Group
 DMG Events
 Nigeria LNG
 Nigerian Breweries
 Unilever
 MTN Nigeria
 Nestlé
 Guinness
 Lafarge (company)
 Dantata and Sawoe Construction
 NNPC
 CFAO
 Medbury Medical Services
 Statoil
 Flour Mill Nigeria
 Hygeia
 United Bank for Africa
 Bollore Africa Logistics
 Abdulai Taiwo & co
 The Nation newspaper
 Addax Petroleum
 SO&U
 Spectranet
 Sea Trucks Group
 APM Terminals
 Alsako Saad Enterprises

References 

  UNAIDS, 2007
 NIBUCAA Launches Project to Increase Knowledge of HIV Status This Day News, 3 June 2021,
 NIBUCAA begins HIV awareness programme in Abuja, Ebonyi, Edo
 Private sector charges companies on healthy living, HIV eradication
 NIBUCAA LAUNCHES PROJECT ‘‘I KNOW MY STATUS’’ IN ABUJA, EBONYI AND EDO
 Experts seek sustained investments in HIV/AIDS response amid COVID-19 pandemic
 NiBUCCA hosts World Health Day, focuses on HIV AIDS response in COVID-19 era
 NiBUCAA tackles HIV/AIDS on World Health Day
 LSACA sensitises private sector HR Managers on workplace policy on HIV, AIDS

External links 
 NiBUCAA

HIV/AIDS prevention organizations
2003 establishments in Nigeria
HIV/AIDS in Nigeria